The 1966 FIBA Africa Championship for Women was the 1st FIBA Africa Championship for Women, played under the rules of FIBA, the world governing body for basketball, and the FIBA Africa thereof. The tournament was hosted by the Guinea from April 10 to 15, 1966.

On day 3 of the competition the United Arab Republic had a 1-1 record while Guinea had a 2-0 record. The United Arab Republic won the match 35-23 with both teams finishing with a 2-1 record but the U.A.R. benefitting from the head-to-head advantage and thus becoming the first African women's basketball champion.

Participating teams

Schedule

Final standings

Awards

External links
Official Website

References

1966 in Guinea
1966 in African basketball
AfroBasket Women
Basketball in Guinea
International sports competitions hosted by Guinea